Gavan John O'Herlihy (29 July 1951 – 15 September 2021) was an American actor. He was known for playing Chuck Cunningham in the first episodes of Happy Days, as well as his appearances in films such as Never Say Never Again, Death Wish 3, Willow, and Superman III.

Early life
O'Herlihy was born 29 July 1951 in Malibu, California, the son of Irish parents, actor Dan O'Herlihy and his wife, Sandymount native Elsie Bennett.

After graduating from Phillips Academy in Massachusetts, he attended Trinity College, Dublin and as an avid tennis player, he became Irish National Tennis Champion.

Career

He has over thirty screen credits to his name, most of them in villainous or antagonistic roles such as Never Say Never Again, Superman III, Death Wish 3 and The Last Outlaw. His role as Airk Thaughbaer in the 1988 fantasy Willow is one of the few heroic roles that he has portrayed, as well as that of the dashing American Loyalist officer from Virginia Captain Leroy in Sharpe's Eagle.

He appeared in Rich Man, Poor Man and Tales From The Crypt. In 1994, he starred as John Garrideb in "The Mazarin Stone" from Granada TV's Sherlock Holmes series. The events of the story were rewritten and merged with The Adventure of the Three Garridebs.

He was cast as the eldest sibling, Chuck Cunningham, on Happy Days. He  played Chuck during season 1 until the episode "Give the Band a Hand" and was replaced for season 2 by Randolph Roberts until the episode "Guess Who's Coming to Christmas". Chuck was not seen again but was later mentioned in a few other episodes ending with "Fish and the Fins". After that, Chuck was written off the show completely with later episodes depicting the Cunningham family with only two children with Richie as the elder. The character gave rise to the pejorative term "Chuck Cunningham Syndrome", referring to characters who disappear from TV-shows without an In-Universe explanation and are later retconned to have never existed. O'Herlihy did not want to become stuck in television roles, preferring films. He played a warrior in the George Lucas production Willow, directed by his Happy Days brother, Ron Howard. He also appeared in the pilot episode of Star Trek: Voyager, "Caretaker", as the Kazon First Mage, Jabin. He also appeared in The Six Million Dollar Man and The Bionic Woman television series.

O'Herlihy was cast as sadistic killer Dan Suggs in the 1989 miniseries Lonesome Dove.

By the 1990s, O'Herlihy had permanently relocated to the UK, where he preferred to work in the theatre and on television, with roles on British television, including Coded Hostile, Sharpe, Jonathan Creek, and Midsomer Murders.

In 2009, O'Herlihy returned to the big screen as Sheriff Vaines in the follow up to Neil Marshall's cult horror film, The Descent Part 2, and over a decade later returned to the screen again to play the leading role of writer John Anderson for director Nic Saunders in Queen of the Redwood Mountains, a film inspired by the authors of the Beat Generation, and due for release in 2021.

Personal life
O'Herlihy had four children. He died in Bath, Somerset, on September 15, 2021, at the age of 70 of undisclosed causes.

Selected filmography

Happy Days (1974) - Charles "Chuck" Cunningham
The California Kid (1974) - Tom
A Death in Canaan (1978) - Father Mark
A Wedding (1978) - Wilson Briggs
A Rumor of War (1980) - Stanton 
We'll Meet Again (1982) - Captain "Red" Berwash
Superman III (1983) - Brad Wilson
Never Say Never Again (1983) - Captain Jack Petachi
The Secret Adversary (1983, TV Movie) - Julius P. Hersheimmer
Space Riders (1984) - Ron Harris
The Dirty Dozen: Next Mission (1985, TV Movie) - Conrad E. Perkins
Death Wish 3 (1985) - Manny Fraker
A Killing on the Exchange (1987)
Willow (1988) - Airk Thaughbaer
Lonesome Dove (1989) - Dan Suggs
Twin Peaks (1990) - Preston King
Conagher (1991) - Chris Mahler
The Last Outlaw (1993) - Marshal Sharp
Sharpe's Eagle (1993) - Captain Leroy
Sherlock Holmes (1994, Episode: "The Mazarin Stone") - John Garrideb
The Shooter (1995) - Dick Powell
Prince Valiant (1997) - King Thane
Top of the World (1997) - Lieutenant Logan
Command Approved (2000) - Arms Dealer
Butterfly Man (2002) - Bill Kincaid
Seven Days of Grace (2006) - MacNab
The Descent Part 2 (2009) - Vaines
Queen of the Redwood Mountains (2021) - John Anderson

References

External links
 

1951 births
2021 deaths
20th-century American male actors
21st-century American male actors
American male film actors
American male stage actors
American male television actors
American people of Irish descent
Male actors from Dublin (city)
Male actors from Los Angeles
British television actors
People from Bath, Somerset